Dubingiai Castle was a residential castle in Dubingiai, Molėtai district, Lithuania.

The first masonry castle was constructed by Vytautas, Grand Duke of Lithuania, in 1412-1413 on an island, now a peninsula, in Lake Asveja in order to secure the capital Vilnius from attacks from Livonia. No accounts concerning the architecture of Vytautas' castle have survived. It was acquired by Jerzy Radziwiłł prior to 1508. He constructed a new palace in the Renaissance style in the first half of the 16th century. After the death of Jerzy, his son Mikolaj "the Red" inherited the property, causing the town nearby to become an important hub for the Reformation in Lithuania. Barbara Radziwiłł spent five months in the castle after her marriage to Sigismund Augustus in 1547. The palace used to be one of the most luxurious residences in the Duchy, lagging not much behind the Royal Palace. Dubingiai Castle was the main seat of the Biržai-Dubingiai line of the Radziwiłł family until the second half of the 17th century, when it was transferred to Biržai Castle.

During the Polish–Swedish wars, the castle was pillaged by armies loyal to the King of Poland and was confiscated from Bogusław Radziwiłł. It returned to the family in the second half of the 17th century. The neglected castle and church gradually fell into ruins.  It was sold to Michał Tyszkiewicz in 1808. Today only the foundations and several cellars of the castle and church remain and are being researched.

The masonry Calvinist Church of the Holy Spirit was built in the Renaissance style near the castle by Janusz Radziwiłł prior to 1620 and was intended to be the mausoleum of the Radziwiłł family. The most prominent members of the family were interred there, including Mikołaj "the Black" Radziwiłł (1565) and his wife Elżbieta Szydłowiecka (1562), Mikołaj "the Red" Radziwiłł (1584) and Janusz Radziwiłł (1620). Their remains were discovered during archaeological excavations in 2004 and reburied there on 5 September 2009.

See also
List of castles in Lithuania

References

  Exploration of the Dubingiai Castle
  Research of Radvilos' Residence

Former castles in Lithuania
Buildings and structures in Utena County
Tourist attractions in Utena County
Castles and palaces of the Radziwiłł family